Trojanowski is a Polish masculine surname, its feminine counterpart is Trojanowska. Its Russian and Ukrainian versions are transliterated as Troyanovsky, Troyanovski, Troyanovskyi, Troianovski (masculine) or Troyanovskaya (feminine). It may refer to:

Anton Troianovski (born 1985), Soviet-born American journalist
Daniel Trojanowski (born 1982), Polish rower
Eduard Troyanovsky (born 1980), Russian boxer 
Izabela Trojanowska (born 1955), Polish singer and film actress
John Q. Trojanowski (1946-2022), American scientist
Mieczyslaw Rys-Trojanowski (1881–1945), Polish general
Oleg Troyanovsky (1919–2003), ambassador of the Soviet Union to Japan and China 
Tadeusz Trojanowski (1933–1997), Polish wrestler 
Wincenty Trojanowski (1859–1928), Polish painter
Yevhen Troyanovskyi (born 1993), Ukrainian football player
Zdzisław Trojanowski (1928-2006), Polish ice hockey player

Polish-language surnames